Choi Myung-Yong (Hangul: 최명용, born 21 July 1976) is a football referee in the South Korean K-League. He has been refereeing in the K-League since 2005. Choi was awarded a FIFA badge in 2007 and is now eligible to referee international matches.

Honors
 2010 K-League Best Referee Awards

References

1976 births
Living people
South Korean football referees